What the Toll Tells is the second album recorded by Two Gallants released in February 2006 (see 2006 in music). It was recorded at Tiny Telephone Studios, San Francisco during July 2005.

This album is the 91st release of Saddle Creek Records.

Critical response

What the Toll Tells received generally favorable reviews from music critics around the country.  The album received a high score of 71 on metacritic.com, a review-aggregation website.

Controversy
The song "Long Summer Day", which is based on the Moses Platt song, was criticised in multiple publications' reviews of the album, including in Prefix Magazine and Pitchfork Media. The song describes a black man dealing with the oppression of a white boss, and considering a possibly violent reaction. The use of the word "nigger" in particular drew fire, with reviews claiming the Two Gallants (both white) were "borrowing otherness" in writing the song. The Two Gallants gave a sarcastic reply on their website, claiming to be unaware that they aren't allowed to "write about our country's embarrassing past" and that they are required to write about "the trials of two pale skinned urbanites who have never known a day of struggle in their lives".

Track listing
 "Las Cruces Jail" – 5:46
 "Steady Rollin'" – 4:28
 "Some Slender Rest" – 8:57
 "Long Summer Day" – 4:54
 "The Prodigal Son" – 3:13
 "Threnody" – 9:34
 "16th St. Dozens" – 5:15
 "Age of Assassins" – 8:01
 "Waves of Grain" – 9:34
 "Big Lucille" (vinyl only)
 "Negrophilia Blues" (vinyl only)

Credits
Alberto Cuéllar - Antonio Cuellar Trombone, Trumpet
Jackie Perez Gratz - Cello
Alan Hynes - Design
Chelsea Jackson (pseudonym of Adam Stephens) - Guitar, Harmonica, vocals
Dan Kasin - Management
Scott Solter - Engineer, Mixing
Doug VanSloun - Mastering
Auggie Washington (pseudonym of Tyson Vogel) - drums, Vocals

Notes

Two Gallants (band) albums
2006 albums
Saddle Creek Records albums